Sylvia Plachy (born 24 May 1943) is a Hungarian-American photographer. Plachy's work has been featured in many New York city magazines and newspapers and she "was an influential staff photographer for The Village Voice."

Biography 
Plachy was born in Budapest, Hungary. Her Hungarian Jewish mother was in hiding in fear of Nazi persecution during World War II. Her father was a Hungarian Roman Catholic of aristocratic descent and she was raised in his faith.

Plachy's family moved to New York City in 1958, two years after the Hungarian revolution, after crossing into Austria for safety, hidden in a horse-drawn cart. She started photographing in 1964 "with an emphasis of recording the visual character of the city along with its diverse occupants".
Plachy studied photography at the Pratt Institute in New York City, receiving her B.F.A. in 1965. There she met the photographer André Kertész, who became her lifelong friend.

Plachy's photo essays and portraits have appeared in The New York Times Magazine, The Village Voice, The New Yorker, Granta, Artforum, Fortune, and other publications. They have been exhibited in galleries and museums in Berlin, Budapest, Chicago, Minneapolis, New York City, Paris and Tokyo, and are in collection of the Museum of Modern Art in New York City, the Minneapolis Institute of Arts, the Houston Museum of Fine Arts, and the San Francisco Museum of Modern Art. She started working at The Village Voice in 1974.

Plachy's first book, Sylvia Plachy's Unguided Tour, won the Infinity Award from the International Center of Photography for best publication in 1991. Her book Self Portrait with Cows Going Home (2005), a personal history of Central Europe with photographs and text, received a Golden Light Award for best book in 2004.

Her other books are Red Light: Inside the Sex Industry with James Ridgeway (1996), Signs & Relics (2000), Out of the Corner of My Eye (2008) and Goings On About Town: Photographs for The New Yorker (2007). Plachy has been honored with a Guggenheim Fellowship (1977), a Lucie Award (2004), and the Dr. Erich Salomon Award (2010). She has taught and lectured widely.

Plachy lives in New York City with her husband, Elliot Brody, and is the mother of Academy Award-winning actor Adrien Brody.

Publications

References

External links 
 Sylvia Plachy's website
 Audio interview with Plachy and photographs by her
 photos from Style series
 New York Times article

1943 births
Living people
Hungarian women artists
The Village Voice people
Hungarian emigrants to the United States
People from Budapest
Photographers from New York City
Holocaust survivors
Hungarian Ashkenazi Jews
20th-century American photographers
20th-century photographers
20th-century American women photographers
21st-century American women